Michael Kenna may refer to

 Michael Kenna (politician) (1857-1946), American politician
 Michael Kenna (photographer) (born 1953), English photographer